Sonja R. West is an American legal scholar and writer working as the Otis Brumby Distinguished Professor in First Amendment Law at University of Georgia.

Education 
West earned a Bachelor of Arts degree in journalism from the University of Iowa in 1993 and a Juris Doctor from the University of Chicago Law School in 1998. As an undergraduate, she wrote for The Daily Iowan.

Career 
From 1993 to 1995, West worked as a newspaper columnist and reporter. She served as a law clerk for Judge Dorothy Wright Nelson in 1998 and 1999 and for Justice John Paul Stevens in 1999 and 2000. From 2000 to 2002, West was an associate at Gibson Dunn in Los Angeles. She worked as an associate at Davis Wright Tremaine before joining the University of Alabama School of Law as a Hugo Black Faculty Fellow in 2004. In 2006, West joined the University of Georgia School of Law as an associate professor. She frequently authors op-ed columns on law and the media for The Washington Post, The New York Times, CNN.com, and Slate.

References

Year of birth missing (living people)
Living people
University of Georgia faculty
American lawyers
University of Iowa alumni
University of Chicago alumni